Cahirnarry (also Cahernarry) was a parish in County Limerick, Republic of Ireland. It was settled in 1837 with nearly 2,000 inhabitants over nearly equal acreage covered by meadows, pastures, limestone quarries, and a bog. It had a school, church, and police station.

Notes

Civil parishes of County Limerick